The Transition may refer to:

The Transition (album), studio album by Muslim Belal
The Transition (EP), EP by Say No More
The Transition EP, EP by Philmont
"The Transition" (song), song by Hawthorne Heights from their album The Silence in Black and White
Spanish transition to democracy, after the death of Francisco Franco in 1975

See also
The Transitions, American R&B group
Transition (disambiguation)